Martin Gordon Wallace (born April 22, 1990) is a former American football offensive tackle. He played college football at Temple.

Professional career

Cleveland Browns
On April 30, 2013, he signed with the Cleveland Browns as an undrafted free agent. Wallace made his NFL debut in the Browns season finale against the Pittsburgh Steelers on December 29, 2013 and played on special teams.

Carolina Panthers
On October 21, 2014, the Carolina Panthers signed Wallace to their practice squad. On January 13, 2015, he signed a reserve/future contract with the Panthers. On September 5, 2015, he was released by the Panthers.

Tampa Bay Buccaneers
On September 9, 2015, the Tampa Bay Buccaneers signed Wallace to their practice squad. On September 15, 2015, he was released by the Buccaneers. He returned to the practice squad on September 22, 2015. On October 6, 2015, Wallace was released by the Buccaneers. On October 20, 2015, he was re-re-signed to the practice squad. On October 27, 2015, he was released by the Buccaneers.

Chicago Bears
On November 11, 2015, Wallace was signed by the Bears to the practice squad. On January 5, 2016, Wallace signed a futures contract with the Chicago Bears. On August 28, 2016, Wallace was waived by the Bears.

Arizona Cardinals
On October 10, 2016, Wallace was signed to the Cardinals' practice squad. He was released by the Cardinals on October 25, 2016 and was re-signed the next day. He was released by the Cardinals on November 1, 2016.

New York Jets
On December 14, 2016, Wallace was signed to the Jets' practice squad.

New York Giants
On January 12, 2017, Wallace signed a reserve/future contract with the Giants. On May 15, 2017, he was waived by the Giants.

New Orleans Saints
On July 25, 2017, Wallace signed with the New Orleans Saints. On August 4, 2017, Wallace was waived/injured by the Saints and placed on injured reserve. He was released by the Saints on November 6, 2017.

References

External links
Temple Owls bio
Cleveland Browns bio

Living people
1990 births
American football offensive tackles
Cleveland Browns players
Carolina Panthers players
Chicago Bears players
Players of American football from New York City
Northeastern Huskies football players
Tampa Bay Buccaneers players
Temple Owls football players
Arizona Cardinals players
New York Jets players
New York Giants players
New Orleans Saints players